Ananyeva is a rural locality (a village) in Beloyevskoye Rural Settlement, Kudymkarsky District, Perm Krai, Russia. The population was 87 as of 2010. There is 1 street.

Geography 
Ananyeva is located 21 km northwest of Kudymkar (the district's administrative centre) by road. Beloyevo is the nearest rural locality.

References 

Rural localities in Kudymkarsky District